Analog Café and Theater, or simply The Analog, was a cafe and music venue in Portland, Oregon's Hosford-Abernethy neighborhood, in the United States. The venue also hosts DRD Records.

History
In May 2018, the venue's owner was accused of sexual harassment, causing some musicians to cancel performances. Donnie Rife denied the anonymous accusations, and decided to leave. New owners were expected by mid-May. The venue has closed, as of 2019.

Events
Analog has hosted a variety of music acts, including Mitski in 2016, Sunny Sweeney in 2017, and Dark Funeral in 2018. Immediately after cannabis became legal in Oregon on July 1, 2015, Rife hosted "Free Marijuana Mondays".

See also
 List of defunct restaurants of the United States

References

External links

 
 

Defunct music venues in Portland, Oregon
Defunct restaurants in Portland, Oregon
Hosford-Abernethy, Portland, Oregon